Miss World 2016, the 66th edition of the Miss World pageant, was held on December 18, 2016 at the MGM National Harbor, Oxon Hill, Maryland, United States. 117 contestants from all over the world competed for the crown. Mireia Lalaguna of Spain crowned her successor Stephanie Del Valle of Puerto Rico at the end of the event. It was the second time that the Miss World pageant held in the United States. It was the second time where Puerto Rico won Miss World, after Wilnelia Merced in 1975.

Results

Placements

§ People's Choice winner

Continental Queens of Beauty

Challenge Events
The Miss World Organization reintroduced for the 2016 finals the Fast-Track system, in which the winners of the five Challenge Events automatically earned a place in the Top 20. The 2016 Challenge Events included Sports, Top Model, Talent, Multimedia and Beauty With A Purpose. The Interview scores determined the rest of the Top 20.

Sports
Miss Cook Islands won the Sports challenge and became the first quarter-finalist of Miss World 2016.

Top Model
Miss China won the Top Model Competition held on December 15, 2016. She became the second quarter-finalist of Miss World 2016.

Talent
Miss World worked in partnership with Mobstar to conduct the public vote and find the winner of the Talent challenge. Miss Mongolia received the most votes and became the third quarter-finalist of Miss World 2016.

Multimedia
Miss Philippines was named the winner of the Multimedia challenge and became the fourth quarter-finalist of Miss World 2016. The decision was based on the candidate's posts on her official Facebook page and Twitter account, as well as her Mobstar ranking.

Beauty With a Purpose
Five finalists were announced on December 17, 2016. Miss Indonesia was named the winner during the final night and became the fifth quarter-finalist of Miss World 2016.

Contestants
117 delegates competed in Miss World 2016:

Judges
The judges panel for Miss World 2016 were:
 Julia Morley – Chairman of the Miss World Pageant Organization
 Mike Dixon – Musical Director
 Ken Warwick – Hollywood producer and executive producer and director of Miss World
 Andrew Minarik – head of the team for Miss World Hair & Beauty
 Donna Walsh – professional dancer and director
 Liliana Tanoesoedibjo – CEO of Media Nusantara Citra, Owner and National Director of Miss Indonesia
 Wilnelia Merced – Miss World 1975 from Puerto Rico
 Linda Pétursdóttir – Miss World 1988 from Iceland
 Azra Akın – Miss World 2002 from Turkey
 Ksenia Sukhinova – Miss World 2008 from Russia
 Carina Tyrrell – Miss England 2014

Notes

Debuts

Returns
Last competed in 1990:
 

Last competed in 2008:
 
 

Last competed in 2010:
 

Last competed in 2011:
 

Last competed in 2012:
 

Last competed in 2013:
 

Last competed in 2014:

Designations
 Antigua & Barbuda – Latisha Greene was appointed as Miss Antigua & Barbuda World by Calvin Southwell, president of Antigua Pageants Ltd and national director of Miss World in the island nation.
 – Kadia Turnbull was chosen Miss World British Virgin Islands 2016 at a casting call held by Damion Grange, the national director of Miss World British Virgin Islands pageant.
 - Melania González was appointed Miss Mundo Costa Rica 2016 after a casting call was organized by Allan Aleman, the national director of Reinas de Costa Rica pageant who is also franchise holder for Miss World in Costa Rica.
 - Ana Cortez was appointed to represent El Salvador at Miss World 2016 by Telecorporacion Salvadorena, the license holder for Miss World in El Salvador after the national pageant, Nuestra Belleza El Salvador was not held for the second consecutive year. Cortez works for the company as a TV presenter and DJ radio host. 
 - Selina Kriechbaum was appointed to compete at Miss World 2016 by Detlef Tursies, the national director of Miss Deutschland pageant after the 2016 edition of the pageant was postponed to early November. Kriechbaum represented the state of Hesse at Miss Deutschland 2015 and was the 3rd runner-up at the pageant.
 - Bayartsetseg Altangerel was appointed Miss World Mongolia 2016 after a casting call was organized by Asian Future Group the franchise holder for Miss World in Mongolia.
 - Katarina Keković, Miss Universe Montenegro 2015 was appointed to compete at Miss World 2016 by Vesna De Vinča, the national director of Miss Montenegro pageant who decided to send Tea Babic, Miss Montenegro 2016 to Miss World 2017 pageant so as to allow more preparation time for the new delegate after the national contest was postponed to late October 2016. Keković was the 1st runner-up at Miss Montenegro 2015 pageant and was supposed to compete at Miss Universe 2016 however she has been replaced by Adela Zoranić, Miss Universe Montenegro 2016.
 - Debbie Collins, MBGN Universe 2015 was appointed to compete at Miss World 2016 by Silverbird Group, the license holder for Miss World in Nigeria after MBGN 2016 pageant was cancelled because of economic recession plaguing the country. Collins represent the Ebonyi State at MBGN 2015 and was the 1st runner-up at the pageant.
  – Alessandra Bueno was chosen Señorita Panamá Mundo 2016 by Edwin Dominguez after being appointed the new franchise holder for Miss World in Panama. Bueno was selected at casting call held in association with Justine Pasek and Cesar Anel Rodríguez, the organizers of Señorita Panamá pageant due to time constraints in organizing the pageant. Previously Medcom Corporation under the direction of Marisela Moreno held the franchise for Miss World in Panama.
  – Diana Dinu was appointed Miss World Romania 2016 by Ernest Hadrian Böhm, the national director of Miss World Romania after a casting call was organized by ExclusivEvent agency franchise holders for Miss World in Romania.
 - Bhamaa Padmanathan was appointed Miss World Singapore 2016 after a casting call was held by Inès Ligron the new national director of Miss World Singapore pageant. Previously Raymund Ooi held the franchise for Miss World in Singapore.
  - Daniella Marie Walcott was appointed Miss World Trinidad and Tobago 2016, by Vanessa Sahatoo-Manoo, the President of Oneness Entertainment and the national director of Miss World Trinidad & Tobago pageant after taking into account the weak corporate economic situation in the country. Walcott is also the younger sister of Gabrielle Walcott who was 2nd runner-up at Miss World 2008 and also the cousin of Magdalene Walcott, who made it to the Top 20 at Miss World 2003. Daniella has been training since she was 12 years old by Miss World 1986, Giselle Laronde to become Miss World.
  – Meriem Hammemi was appointed to represent Tunisia at Miss World 2016 by Aida Antar the national director of Miss Tunisie pageant because of scheduling conflicts after the 2016 edition of the pageant was postponed to early December 2016. Hammemi represented the Governarate of Béja at the Miss Tunisie 2015 and was the 2nd runner-up at the pageant.
  -  Kyrelle Thomas was appointed Miss US Paradise World 2016 after a casting call was organised by Cnydee Frontal, the national director of Miss US Paradise pageant.
  - Diana Croce was appointed to compete at Miss World 2016 by Osmel Sousa, the national director of Miss Venezuela pageant after Miss Venezuela Mundo 2016 pageant was not held because of ongoing economic recession in the country. Croce represented the state of Nueva Esparta at Miss Venezuela 2016 and was the 1st Runner-Up at the pageant.

Replacements
  - Camila Macías was crowned the new Belleza Argentina 2016 by Nadia Cerri, the national director of Belleza Argentina pageant, after Elena Roca the original winner was dethroned for committing repeated breaches of obligations stipulated in her contract. Macias represented the province of Córdoba at Belleza Argentina 2016 and was the 1st runner-up at the pageant.
  – Nashaira Balentien, Miss World Curaçao 2016 will not compete in this edition due personal reason. Sabrina Namias de Castro, replace her, Sabrina previously competed at Reina Hispanoamericana 2016.
  - Morgane Edvige was appointed Miss World France 2016 by Sylvie Tellier, the national director of Miss France pageant, as a replacement to Iris Mittenaere, Miss France 2016,  who will not be able to compete at Miss World contest because of conflicting schedules, as she crowns her successor just a day before the Miss World 2016 finals. Edvige represented the island of Martinique at Miss France 2016 and was the 1st runner-up at the pageant. Mittenaere would later win Miss Universe 2016 in Manila.
  - Evelyn Njambi replaced Roshanara Ebrahim, Miss World Kenya 2016 after she was stripped of her title by Terry Muigai, the national director of Miss World Kenya pageant for the breach of code of conduct stipulated in her contract. Njambi represented Kiambu County at the Miss World Kenya 2016 and was crowned the 1st runner-up at the pageant 
  - Lebakile Mokhohlane, the original winner of Miss Lesotho 2016 pageant, declined to participate at Miss World 2016 pageant due to her study commitments, hence Rethabile Tsosane was appointed to replace Mokhohlane. Tsosane was the 4th runner-up at Miss Lesotho 2016 pageant and had also won the Top Model award.

Withdrawals
 – Miss Bermuda 2016 pageant was not held due to lack of funding and sponsorship.
  – Julia Nguimfack, Miss Cameroon 2016 withdrew due to visa problems.
  – Soliyana Assefa, Miss Ethiopia 2016 withdrew at the last minute.
  – Miss Gabon 2016 pageant was postponed due to the political turmoil and unrest in the country that followed after the general elections.
  – No delegate was appointed due to lack of funding and sponsorship.
  – Lizelle Esterhuizen, Miss Namibia 2016, not compete at Miss World pageant after Conny Maritz, the national director of the Miss Namibia pageant, decided to send Esterhuizen only to Miss Universe 2016 due to lack of funding and sponsorship. Usually the winner of Miss Namibia pageant competes at both Miss World and Miss Universe pageants.
  – No delegate was appointed due to lack of funding and sponsorship.
  – No delegate was appointed due to lack of funding and sponsorship.
 – No delegate was appointed due to lack of funding and sponsorship.
  – the Miss Zambia 2016 pageant finals were scheduled just a day before the Miss World finals.
  – Miss Zimbabwe Trust chairperson Mary Chiwenga cancelled the 2016 edition of the Miss Zimbabwe pageant due to lack of quality candidates to compete at an international level.

References

External links
 

Miss World
2016 beauty pageants
2016 in Washington, D.C.
Beauty pageants in the United States
December 2016 events in the United States
Oxon Hill, Maryland